"Get Used to It" is a song written by Michael Omartian and Roger Voudouris and performed by Voudouris. The song was featured on his 1979 album, Radio Dream. The song was produced by Michael Omartian.

Chart performance
It reached #4 in Australia, #18 on the U.S. adult contemporary chart, and #21 on the Billboard Hot 100 in 1979.  
The single spent 19 weeks on the American charts, ranking 83rd on the Billboard Year-End Hot 100 singles of 1979.

Weekly charts

Year-end charts

See also
List of 1970s one-hit wonders in the United States

References

External links
Lyrics of this song 
 

1979 songs
1979 singles
Songs written by Michael Omartian
Song recordings produced by Michael Omartian
Warner Records singles